Giorgi Kimadze (born 11 February 1992) is a Georgian footballer who plays for Torpedo Kutaisi.

International
He made his Georgia national football team debut on 25 January 2017 in a friendly game against Jordan.

Honours
Torpedo Kutaisi
Erovnuli Liga: (1) 2017
Georgian Cup: (3) 2016, 2018, 2022
Georgian Super Cup: (2) 2018, 2019

Dinamo Tbilisi
Erovnuli Liga: (3) 2019, 2020, 2022
 Georgian Super Cup: (1) 2021

References

External links
 
 
 Torpedo player profile

1992 births
Living people
Footballers from Georgia (country)
Georgia (country) international footballers
FC Chikhura Sachkhere players
FC Torpedo Kutaisi players
FC Dinamo Tbilisi players
Association football fullbacks